Hazkarat Neshamot, commonly known by its opening word Yizkor, is an Ashkenazi Jewish memorial prayer service for the dead. It is important occasion for many Jews, even those who do not attend synagogue regularly. In most Ashkenazi communities, it is held after the Torah reading four times a year: on Yom Kippur, on the final day of Passover, on the second day of Shavuot, and on Shemini Atzeret.

In Sephardic custom there is no Yizkor prayer, but the hashkavot serve a similar role in the service.

Origin

The earliest source of Yizkor is the Midrash Tanchuma, which mentions the custom of remembering the deceased and pledging charity on their behalf on Yom Kippur. The service was popularized amid the persecution of Jews during the Crusades.

Customs
It is customary for those with both parents alive to leave the main sanctuary during the Yizkor service, out of respect or superstition. It is usually not attended within the first year of mourning, until the first yahrzeit has passed. The Yizkor prayers are intended to be recited in a synagogue with a minyan; if one is unable to be with a minyan, one can recite it without one. Still, this practice is a custom and historically not regarded to be obligatory.

In some congregations, Yizkor begins with responsive verses and may also include Psalm 91.
In addition to personal Yizkor prayers, there are also often collective prayers for martyrs and for victims of the Holocaust, and an appeal for charity. The service concludes with the prayer El male raḥamim.

Yahrzeit candles are commonly lit on the days when Yizkor is recited.

Notes

References

External links
 Text of Yizkor at Sefaria

Bereavement in Judaism
Jewish prayer and ritual texts
Hebrew words and phrases in Jewish prayers and blessings
Passover
Shavuot
Shemini Atzeret
Yom Kippur